'''Živinice  is a city in northern Bosnia and Herzegovina.

References

Villages in Republika Srpska
Populated places in Derventa